Carl Anderson (born 4 October 1977) is a New Zealand cricketer. He played in 17 first-class and 54 List A matches for Canterbury between 1997 and 2006.

See also
 List of Canterbury representative cricketers

References

External links
 

1977 births
Living people
New Zealand cricketers
Canterbury cricketers
Cricketers from Christchurch